"Doctor Know-all" is a German fairy tale collected by the Brothers Grimm, tale number 98 in Grimms' Fairy Tales. It is Aarne-Thompson type 1641 about being in the right place at the right time. Another tale of this type is Almondseed and Almondella.

Synopsis
A peasant named Crabbe saw how well a doctor ate and asked him how to become one. The doctor told him to buy an ABC book with a rooster up front, sell his oxen and cart to buy doctor's equipment and clothing, and advertise himself as "Doctor Know-all." Crabbe takes this advice serious and soon becomes a doctor under this name.

Shortly after he set himself up, a nobleman visited him and asked to find stolen money. Crabbe insists that his wife should come along. At the nobleman's home Crabbe and his wife are invited for dinner. When they sat to eat, Crabbe nudged his wife at each course, saying "That's one," "That's two," and "That's three" – meaning three courses. However, the servants who brought the dishes and who'd actually stolen the money thought he was identifying them. The fourth servant then brought the final meal under a covered tray. The lord asked the doctor to show his all-knowing skill and guess what was underneath the tray. Crabbe, who had no idea, pitied himself and cried: "Ah, poor Crabbe!" As it happens the meal was indeed a plate full of crabs.

All four servants were now in complete panic. They asked Crabbe to speak to him confidently and confessed their crime. If he would not denounce them they would willingly restore the money and give him part of the finders' reward. Crabbe agreed and was shown where the loot was hidden. He then went back to the nobleman, sat down to the table and pretended to look for the answer in his ABC book. Meanwhile, a fifth servant was hiding inside a stove to listen if Doctor Know-all still knew more. When Crabbe tried to look up the answer he said: "I know you are there, so you better show yourself!" The servant inside the stove thought Crabbe meant him and jumped out the stove. Then Crabbe revealed where the money was and received a lot of money both from the nobleman as well as from the frightened servants, becoming a wealthy and renowned man.

Analysis
The folktale is widespread "throughout Europe, India, Asia, some parts of Africa" and in the Americas.

Commenting on the tale repertoire of female storyteller Argyro, a Greek refugee from Asia Minor, Greek scholar Marianthi Kaplanoglou stated that she knew a story of the tale type ATU 1641, a "common" type to both "the Greek and Turkish corpora".

German scholar , in his catalogue of Persian folktales, listed 10 variants of the tale type across Persian sources, with the title Der falsche Wahrsager ("The False Soothsayer").

According to Professor , the tale type is reported to register 229 Lithuanian variants, under the banner Doctor Know-All.

References

Further reading
 Retherford, Robert. ""Suan the Guesser": A Filipino Doctor Know-All (AT 1641)". In: Asian Folklore Studies 55, no. 1 (1996): 99-118. Accessed April 6, 2021. doi:10.2307/1178858.

External links

 
Doctor Know-all
"Doctor Know-All and other folktales of Aarne-Thompson type 1641 about being in the right place at the right time"

Grimms' Fairy Tales
Fictional farmers
Fictional physicians
German fairy tales
ATU 1640-1674